Deadseraphim were hardcore band from Lake Elsinore, California.

Members and Related Bands 
 Danny Baker - Vocals
 Brian Thomas - Drums 
 Ryan Jorgensen - Guitar 
 Matt Robison - Bass
 Chris Robertson - Guitar

Related Bands: Spring Break!, The Arm and Sword of A Bastard God, Find Him and Kill Him, Lord of the Bong, Zzyzx, Durga, Orphan Shit, C is for Cookie, Charismatic Dwarf.

Discography 
 Demo - 2000 (cassette) - All never released songs, only about 5 copies and they are all lost.
 Self Titled - 2001 7-inch EP - Self released. 500 copies, 3 test presses hand numbered, purple/gray mix vinyl
 Split with Drowning In Lethe 7-inch EP - Pictora Pilota. 15 test presses, 50 tour covers, 500 blue vinyl.
 Split with Montcalm 12-inch LP - Pretty in Pink/Glory Hole/Vernon. 15 test presses, 100 black vinyl, 400 red vinyl. Various different covers including 25 metal covers (Pretty in Pink pre-order)
 Remain Standing V/A CD - Pictora Pilota.
 Discography digipak CD - Electric Human Project.

References 
 https://web.archive.org/web/20110518222721/http://music.msn.com/album/?album=39881012
 https://web.archive.org/web/20070202163332/http://www.vivalavinyl.org/index.html
 https://web.archive.org/web/20160303195549/http://board.vivalavinyl.org/?func=pdet&t=b&i=93
 https://web.archive.org/web/20061020162555/http://www.electrichumanproject.com/reviews/21.html
 https://web.archive.org/web/20070401035616/http://www.electrichumanproject.com/index2.html

Musical groups from California